The 1919 Presbyterian Blue Hose football team represented Presbyterian College as an independent during the 1919 college football season. Led by the fourth-year head coach Walter A. Johnson, Presbyterian compiled a record of 4–3–2. The team captain was J. Y. Richardson.

Schedule

References

Presbyterian
Presbyterian Blue Hose football seasons
Presbyterian Blue Hose football